Burnashevo is a rural locality (a selo) in Tarbagataysky District, Republic of Buryatia, Russia. The population was 245 as of 2010. There are 3 streets.

Geography 
Burnashevo is located 9 km south of Tarbagatay (the district's administrative centre) by road. Desyatnikovo is the nearest rural locality.

References 

Rural localities in Tarbagataysky District